Klaudia is a feminine given name, a cognate of the name Claudia. It is an equivalent to the male given names Claudius, Claude and Claudio.

Individuals bearing the name Klaudia include:
Klaudia Adamek (born 1999), Polish sprinter
Klaudia Alagierska (born 1996), Polish volleyball player
Klaudia Boczová (born 1990), Slovak tennis player 
Klaudia Breś (born 1994), Polish sport shooter
Klaudia Dernerová (born 1971), Slovak operatic soprano
Klaudia Dudová (born 1988), Czech actress 
Klaudia Fabová (born 1998), Slovak footballer 
Klaudia Grzelak (born 1996), Polish volleyball player
Klaudia Hornung (born 1962), German rower
Klaudia Jachira (born 1988), Polish politician, actress, comedian, and YouTuber
Klaudia Jans-Ignacik (born 1984), Polish tennis player
Klaudia Kaczorowska (born 1988), Polish volleyball player
Klaudia Kardasz (born 1996), Polish shot putter
Klaudia Kinská (born 1978), Slovak gymnast
Klaudia Konieczna (born 1995), Polish volleyball player
Klaudia Konopko (born 1992), Polish sprinter
Klaudia Koronel (born 1975), Filipina businesswoman and actress
Klaudia Kovács, Hungarian film and theater director
Klaudia Kovács (born 1990), Hungarian footballer 
Klaudia Kulon (born 1992), Polish chess player
Klaudia Maliszewska (born 1992), Polish Paralympic shot putter
Klaudia Maruszewska (born 1997), Polish javelin thrower
Klaudia Medlová (born 1993), Slovak snowboarder
Klaudia Michnová (born 1990), Slovak handball player
Klaudia Naziębło (born 1993), Polish swimmer
Klaudia Olejniczak (born 1997), Polish footballer 
Klaudia Pasternak (born 1980), Polish composer and opera conductor
Klaudia Pielesz (born 1988), Polish handball player 
Klaudia Rrotani (born 1995), Albanian footballer 
Klaudia Schifferle (born 1955), Swiss musician (Kleenex, LiLiPUT) and painter
Klaudia Siciarz (born 1998), Polish hurdler
Klaudia Szemereyné Pataki (born 1976), Hungarian politician
Klaudia Taev (1906–1985), Estonian vocal pedagogue
Klaudia Tanner (born 1970), Austrian politician
Klaudia Tasz (born 1973), Polish ski mountaineer
Klaudia Tiitsmaa (born 1990), Estonian actress
Klaudia Wojtunik (born 1999), Polish hurdler
Klaudia Zwolińska (born 1998), Polish slalom canoeist

References

Albanian feminine given names
Estonian feminine given names
Hungarian feminine given names
Polish feminine given names
Slovak feminine given names